Priotrochus is a genus of sea snails, marine gastropod mollusks in the subfamily Cantharidinae of the family Trochidae, the top snails.

Description
The shell has an elevated-conic shape. The columella is crenulate, not toothed. The umbilicus is narrow without spiral funicle.

Species
Species within the genus Priotrochus include:
 Priotrochus aniesae Moolenbeek & Dekker, 1992
 Priotrochus goudoti (Fischer, 1878)
 Priotrochus iris Herbert, 1988
 Priotrochus obscurus (W. Wood, 1828)
Species brought into synonymy
 Priotrochus alexandri Tomlin, 1926: synonym of Priotrochus obscurus ponsonbyi (G. B. Sowerby, 1888)
 Priotrochus chrysolaemus (Martens, 1880): synonym of Priotrochus goudoti (Fischer, 1878)
 Priotrochus incertus Schepman, 1908: synonym of Tibatrochus incertus (Schepman, 1908)
 Priotrochus kotschyi (Philippi, 1849): synonym of Trochus kotschyi Philippi, 1849
 Priotrochus sepulchralis Melvill, 1899: synonym of Priotrochus obscurus obscurus (Wood, 1828)

References

 Herbert D.G. (1988). A new species of Priotrochus (Mollusca: Gastropoda: Trochidae) from south-east Africa. Annals of the Natal Museum 29(2):503-507.

 
Trochidae
Gastropod genera